Eupithecia multiscripta is a moth in the  family Geometridae. It is found in North America, including Colorado, Utah, Idaho, Wyoming, Montana, Washington and California.

The wingspan is about 27 mm. Adults have been recorded on wing from April to June.

References

Moths described in 1896
multiscripta
Moths of North America